Let It Roll is the 7th full album by alt-country band Willard Grant Conspiracy.

Musicians
As with many of the band's albums it is a collaborative effort with Robert Fisher being joined on this occasion by members of The Walkabouts, Lambchop and Dream Syndicate.

Track listing
 "From a Distant Shore"
 "Let It Roll"
 "Dance With Me"
 "Skeleton"
 "Flying Low"
 "Breach"
 "Crush"
 "Mary of the Angels"
 "Ballad of a Thin Man"
 "Lady of the Snowline"

All music written by Robert Fisher, except "Flying Low" by Robert Fisher and Steve Wynn, and "Ballad of a Thin Man" by Bob Dylan.

References

2006 albums
Willard Grant Conspiracy albums
Loose Music albums
Albums recorded in Slovenia